A protist is any eukaryotic organism (one with cells containing a nucleus) that is not an animal, plant, or fungus. The protists do not form a natural group, or clade, since they exclude certain eukaryotes with whom they share a common ancestor; but, like algae or invertebrates, the grouping is used for convenience. In some systems of biological classification, such as the popular five-kingdom scheme proposed by Robert Whittaker in 1969, the protists make up a kingdom called Protista, composed of "organisms which are unicellular or unicellular-colonial and which form no tissues". In the 21st century, the classification shifted toward a two-kingdom system of protists: Chromista (containing the chromalveolate, rhizarian and hacrobian groups) and Protozoa (containing excavates and all protists more closely related to animals and fungi).

The following groups contain protists. The clade Opisthokonta also contains the animals and the fungi, and the kingdom Archaeplastida also contains algae and plants.

Key to symbols used:
(P) = Paraphyletic group.
† = Extinct group.
? = Group of uncertain taxonomic position.
* = Group lacking molecular data.

Overview
This article follows the efforts of the scientific community and the International Society of Protistologists to revise the taxonomy of protists in a manner that reflects their phylogeny and evolution, striving away from the use of historical paraphyletic taxa and relying exclusively on clades as the basis of the classification. The reference used for the general arrangement of groups is the publication Revisions to the Classification, Nomenclature and Diversity of Eukaryotes by Adl et al. (2019). Other studies are used for some specific groups of protists that have been revised after 2018, such as slime moulds, glaucophyte algae, arcellinid testate amoebae and planktonic foraminifera.

The following cladogram shows the relationships between the major groups of protists, as well as the kingdoms of animals, plants and fungi, according to the most recent phylogenetic analyses.

Amorphea

Obazoa 
Incertae sedis Obazoa:
Apusomonadida . Amastigomonas, Apusomonas, Chelonemonas, Manchomonas, Multimonas, Podomonas, Thecamonas, Catacumbia, Cavaliersmithia, Karpovia, Singekia.
Breviatea . Breviata, Lenisia, Pygsuia, Subulatomonas.

Opisthokonta 
Nucletmycea  [Holomycota ]
Rotosphaerida  [Cristidiscoidida ; Nucleariidae ]. Fonticula, Nuclearia, Parvularia, ?Pompholyxophrys, ?Lithocolla, ?Vampyrellidium, ?Pinaciophora, ?Rabdiophrys, ?Rabdiaster.
Fungi . Excluded from protists.
Holozoa . Incertae sedis: Tunicaraptor , Bicellum brasieri . 
Ichthyosporea  [Mesomycetozoea ]
Dermocystida  [Rhinosporidaceae ]. Amphibiocystidium, Amphibiothecum, Chromosphaera, Dermocystidium, Rhinosporidium, Sphaerothecum.
Ichthyophonida  [Ichthyophonae ; Amoebidiidae ]. Abeoforma, Amoebidium, Anurofeca, Astreptonema, Caullerya, Creolimax, Eccrinidus, Enterobryus, Enteropogon, Ichthyophonus, Palavascia, Pseudoperkinsus, Psorospermium, Sphaeroforma.
Pluriformea 
Corallochytrium limacisporium 
Syssomonas multiforma 
Filasterea . Capsaspora, Ministeria, Pigoraptor, Txikispora.
Choanozoa  [Choanozoa  (P)]
Choanoflagellata  [Craspedomonadina ; Craspedomonadaceae ; Craspedophyceae ; Craspédomonadophycidées ; Craspedomonadophyceae ; Choanomonadea ; Choanoflagelliida ; Choanoflagellatea ; Choanomonada ].
Craspedida 
Salpingoecidae . Astrosiga, Aulomonas, Choanoeca, Cladospongia, Codonocladium, Codonosigopsis, Codosiga [Codonosiga], Desmarella [Codonodesmus; Kentrosiga], Dicraspedella, Diploeca, Diplosiga, Diplosigopsis, Hartaetosiga, Kentia, Lagenoeca, Microstomoeca, Monosiga, Mylnosiga, Pachysoeca, Proterospongia, Salpingoeca, Salpingorhiza, Sphaeroeca, Stagondoeca, Stelexomonas, Stylochromonas.
Acanthoecida 
Acanthoecidae . Acanthoeca, Helgoeca, Polyoeca, Savillea.
Stephanoecidae . Acanthocorbis, Amoenoscopa, Apheloecion, Bicosta, Calliacantha, Calotheca, Campanoeca, Campyloacantha, Conion, Cosmoeca, Crinolina, Crucispina, Diaphanoeca, Didymoeca, Kakoeca, Monocosta, Nannoeca, Parvicorbicula, Platypleura, Pleurasiga, Polyfibula, Saepicula, Saroeca, Spinoeca, Spiraloecion, Stephanacantha, Stephanoeca, Syndetophyllum.
Metazoa  [Animalia ; Eumetazoa ]. Excluded from protists.

Amoebozoa 

Incertae sedis Amoebozoa: Belonocystis, Boveella, Biomyxa, Corallomyxa, Gibbodiscus, Hartmannia, Malamoeba, Malpighamoeba, Microcorycia, Microglomus, Oscillosignum, Parmulina, Penardochlamys, Pseudothecamoeba, Rhabdamoeba, Schoutedamoeba, Stereomyxa, Subulamoeba, Thecochaos, Triaenamoeba, Unda, Zonomyxa.

Tubulinea 
Corycida . Amphizonella, Diplochlamys, Trichosphaerium (=Atrichosa), ?Microcorycia, ?Parmulina, ?Penardochlamys, ?Zonomyxa.
Echinamoebida .
Echinamoebidae . Echinamoeba, Micriamoeba.
Vermamoebidae . Vermamoeba.
Elardia 
Leptomyxida 
Leptomyxidae . Leptomyxa.
Rhizamoebidae . Rhizamoeba.
Flabellulidae . Flabellula [incl. Paraflabellula].
Gephyramoebidae . Gephyramoeba.
Arcellinida . Incertae sedis genera: Acipyxis, Apolimia, Argynnia, Armipyxis, Conicocassis, Cornuapyxis, Ellipsopyxella, Ellipsopyxis, Erugomicula, Frenopyxis, Geamphorella, Geoplagiopyxis, Geopyxella, Hoogenraadia, Jungia, Lagenodifflugia, Lamptopyxis, Lamptoquadrula, Leptochlamys, Maghrebia, Meisterfeldia, Microquadrula, Nabranella, Oopyxis, Paracentropyxis, Paraquadrula, Pentagonia, Physochila, Planhoogenraadia, Pomoriella, Pontigulasia, Prantlitina, Proplagiopyxis, Protoplagiopyxis, Protocucurbitella, Pseudawerintzewia, Pseudonebela, Schoenbornia, Sexangularia, Suiadifflugia, Trigonopyxis, Wailesella.
Phryganellina 
Phryganellidae . Phryganella.
Cryptodifflugiidae . Cryptodifflugia.
Organoconcha 
Microchlamyiidae . Microchlamys, Spumochlamys, Pyxidicula.
Glutinoconcha 
Volnustoma 
Heleoperidae . Heleopera.
Hyalospheniformes 
Hyalospheniidae . Alabasta, Alocodera, Apodera, Certesella, Cornutheca, Gibbocarina, Hyalosphenia, Longinebela, Mrabella, Nebela, Padaungiella, Planocarina, Porosia, Quadrulella.
Excentrosoma 
Centropyxidae  [includes Plagiopyxidae]. Awerinzewia, Bullinularia, Centropyxis, Golemanskia, Plagiopyxis.
Cylindrothecina 
Cylindrifflugiidae . Cylindrifflugia.
Longithecina 
Difflugiidae . Difflugia, Zivkovicia.
Lesquereusiidae . Lesquereusia.
Sphaerothecina 
Arcellidae . Arcella, Galeripora.
Netzeliidae . Cucurbitella, Cyclopyxis, Netzelia
Euamoebida 
Amoebina 
Amoebidae . Amoeba, Chaos, Polychaos, Parachaos, Trichamoeba, Deuteramoeba, Hydramoeba
Hartmannellidae . Cashia, Copromyxa, Copromyxella, Glaeseria, Hartmannella, Ptolemeba, Saccamoeba
Nolandina 
Nolandellidae . Nolandella.

Evosea 
Variosea 
Angulamoeba 
Arboramoeba 
Darbyshirella 
Dictyamoeba 
Ischnamoeba 
Heliamoeba 
Filamoeba 
Phalansterium .
Flamellidae . Flamella, Telaepolella.
Protosteliida . Protostelium [incl. Planoprotostelium].
Fractovitellida 
Acramoebidae . Acramoeba.
Schizoplasmodiidae . Ceratiomyxella, Nematostelium, Schizoplasmodium.
Soliformoviidae . Soliformovum, Grellamoeba
Cavosteliida . Cavostelium, Schizoplasmodiopsis, Tychosporium.
Holomastigida . Artodiscus, Multicilia.
Eumycetozoa  [Mycetozoa ]
Dictyostelia  [Dictyosteliomycetes ]. Acytostelium, Cavenderia, Coremiostelium, Dictyostelium, Heterostelium, Polysphondylium, Raperostelium, Rostrostelium, Speleostelium, Tieghemostelium, Synstelium, ?Coenonia.
Ceratiomyxea  [Ceratiomyxomycetes ; Protosporangiida ]
Ceratiomyxa 
Protosporangiidae . Clastostelium, Protosporangium.
Myxogastrea  [Myxomycetes ]
Lucisporomycetidae [Lucisporinia ; Lucisporidia ]. Incertae sedis genera: Arcyriatella, Calonema, Minakatella, Trichioides.
Cribariidia 
Cribariales 
Cribariaceae . Cribaria, Lindbladia, Licaethalium.
Trichiidia 
Reticulariales 
Reticulariaceae . Alwisia, Lycogala, Reticularia, Tubifera.
Liceales 
Liceaceae . Licea, Listerella.
Order Trichiales 
Dianemataceae . Calomyxa, Dianema, Dictydiaethalium, Prototrichia.
Trichiaceae . Hemitrichia [incl. Trichia decipiens], Arcyria [incl. Arcyodes], Perichaena, Trichia [incl. Cornuvia, Metatrichia, Oligonema].
Columellomycetidae [Collumellinia ; Columellidia ]. Incertae sedis genera: Diachea, Echinosteliopsis, Leptoderma, Paradiachea, Protophysarum, Trabrooksia, Willkommlangea.
Echinosteliidia 
Echinosteliales 
Echinosteliaceae . Barbeyella, Echinostelium [incl. Semimorula].
Stemonitidia 
Clastodermatales 
Clastodermataceae . Clastoderma.
Meridermatales 
Meridermataceae . Meriderma.
Stemonitidales 
Stemonitidaceae . Macbrideola, Stemonitis, Symphytocarpus.
Amaurochaetaceae . Comatricha, Stemonaria, Stemonitopsis, Amaurochaete, Brefeldia, Enerthenema, Paradiacheopsis.
Physarales 
Lamprodermataceae . Lamproderma [incl. Dichaeopsis, Colloderma, Elaeomyxa], ?Collaria.
Didymiaceae  – Diderma, Didymium, Lepidoderma, Mucilago.
Physaraceae . Craterium, Leocarpus, Fuligo, Physarum, Physarella, Physarina, Kelleromyxa, Badhamia.
Cutosea  [Squamocutida ]
Squamamoebidae . Armaparvus, Squamamoeba.
Sapocribridae . Sapocribrum.
Archamoebea 
Tricholimacidae . Tricholimax.
Entamoebidae . Entamoeba.
Rhizomastixidae . Rhizomastix.
Mastigamoebida . Endamoeba, Endolymax, Iodamoeba, Mastigamoeba, Mastigina.
Pelobiontida  [Pelomyxidae ]. Mastigella, Pelomyxa

Discosea 
Flabellinia 
Dermamoebida 
Dermamoebidae . Dermamoeba, Paradermamoeba, ?Mycamoeba.
Mayorellidae . Mayorella.
Thecamoebida . Sappinia, Stenamoeba, Stratorugosa, Thecamoeba, Thecochaos.
Dactylopodida . Cunea, ?Janickina,* Korotnevella, Neoparamoeba, Paramoeba, Pseudoparamoeba, Vexillifera.
Vannellida  [Vannellidae ]. Clydonella, Lingulamoeba, Paravannella, Pessonella*, Ripella, Vannella.
Stygamoebida  (P). Stygamoeba, Vermistella.
Centramoebia 
Acanthopodida  [Centramoebida ]. Acanthamoeba, Balamuthia, Luapeleamoeba, Protacanthamoeba, Dracoamoeba, Vacuolamoeba.
Himatismenida . Cochliopodium, Ovalopodium, Parvamoeba.
Pellitida . Endostelium, Gocevia, Paragocevia*, Pellita.

Diaphoretickes 
Incertae sedis Diaphoretickes:
Microheliella maris 
Telonemia  [Telonemidae ]. Lateronema, Telonema.
Picozoa  [Picobiliphytes ]. Picomonas.
Hemimastigophora 
?Paramastix
Spironemidae . Hemimastix, Spironema, Stereonema.
Provora 
Nibbleridia . Nibbleromonas, Ubysseya.
Nebulidia . Nebulomonas, Ancoracysta.

Archaeplastida 
Glaucophyta  [Glaucocystaceae ; Glaucocystophyta ]. Incertae sedis Glaucophyta: ?Archaeopsis, ?Chalarodora, ?Glaucocystopsis, ?Peliaina, ?Strobilomonas.
Cyanophorales . Cyanophora.
Glaucocystales . Glaucocystis.
Gloeochaetales . Cyanoptyche, Gloeochaete.
Rhodophyceae  [Rhodophyta ; Rhodoplantae ]
Chloroplastida  [Viridiplantae ; Chlorobionta ; Chlorobiota ]

SAR

Stramenopiles 
?Environmental clades MAST-21, MAST-25 
?Platysulcus tardus 
Bigyra 
Opalozoa . Incertae sedis: Cantina, Rictus, environmental clades MAST-16, MAST-22 and MAST-24 .
Placidozoa 
Placididea . Allegra, Haloplacidia, Pendulomonas, Placidia, Placilonga, Suigetsumonas, Wobblia.
Nanomonadea  [clade MAST-3]. Incisomonas, Solenicola.
Opalomonadea  [clade MAST-12]. No described species.
Opalinata  [Slopalinida ]
Proteromonadea . Karotomorpha, Proteromonas.
Opalinea . Cepedea, Opalina, Protoopalina, Protozelleriella, Zelleriella.
Blastocystis 
Bicosoecida . Adriamonas, Anoeca, Bicosoeca, Caecitellus, Cafeteria, Cyathobodo, Filos, Halocafeteria, Nanum, Paramonas, Pseudobodo, Pseudodendromonas.
Sagenista . Incertae sedis: environmental clades MAST-4, MAST-7, MAST-8, MAST-9, MAST-10, MAST-11 and MAST-20 .
Labyrinthulomycetes 
Amphitremida . Amphitrema, Archerella, Diplophrys, Paramphitrema.
Amphifilida . Amphifila, Fibrophrys, Sorodiplophrys.
Oblongichytrida . Oblongichytrium.
Labyrinthulida . Aplanochytrium, Labyrinthula, Stellarchytrium.
Thraustochytrida . Althornia, Aurantiochytrium, Botryochytrium, Japanochytrium, Monorhizochytrium, Parietichytrium, Schizochytrium, Sicyoidochytrium, Thraustochytrium, Ulkenia.
Pseudophyllomitidae  [clade MAST-6]. Pseudophyllomitus.
Gyrista . Incertae sedis: environmental clades MAST-1, MAST-2 and MAST-23 .
Bigyromonadea 
Developea . Developayella, Develorapax.
Pirsoniales . Pirsonia.
Pseudofungi  [Heterokontimycotina ].
Hyphochytriales . Anisolpidium, Canteriomyces.
Anisolpidiaceae 
Hyphochytridiomycetaceae . Hyphochytrium.
Rhizidiomycetaceae . Latrostium, Rhizidiomyces, Rhizidiomycopsis.
Oomycetes  [Peronosporomycetes ]. Incertae sedis genera: Atkinsiella, Ciliomyces, Crypticola, Ectrogella, Eurychasma, Halodaphnea, Haliphthoros, Haptoglossa, Lagena, Lagenisma, Olpidiopsis, Pontisma, Pythiella, Rozellopsis, Sirolpidium.
Saprolegnialean lineage . Achlya, Aphanomyces, Aplanopsis, Apodachlya, Aquastella, Geolegnia, Leptomitus, Newbya, Pythiopsis, Protoachlya, Salisapilia, Saprolegnia, Thraustotheca.
Peronosporalean lineage . Albugo, Bremia, Chlamydomyzium, Halophytopthora, Hyaloperonospora, Lagenidium, Myzocytiopsis, Peronospora, Plasmopara, Pythium, Pseudoperonospora, Phytophthora, Phytopythium, Pustula.
Ochrophyta 
Chrysista . Incertae sedis: environmental lineages MOCH-3 and MOCH-5 , Chrysowaernella, Aurearena.
SII clade
Olisthodiscophyceae . Olisthodiscus.
Pinguiophyceae . Glossomastix, Phaeomonas, Pinguiochrysis, Pinguiococcus, Polypodochrysis.
Limnistia 
Chrysophyceae . Incertae sedis: Chryososaccus, Chrysosphera, Cyclonexis, Lygynion, Phaeoplaca.
Chromulinales . Chromulina, Chrysomonas.
Hibberdiales . Hibberdia.
Ochromonadales . Spumella, Pedospumella, Ochromonas.
Paraphysomonadida . Paraphysomonas.
Synurales . Chrysodidymus, Mallomonas, Synura, Tesselaria.
Eustigmatophyceae 
Eustigmatales 
Paraeustigmatos 
Eustigmataceae . ?Ellipsoidion, Chlorobotrys, Eustigmatos, Pseudocharaciopsis, Vischeria.
Monodopsidaceae . Microchloropsis, Monodopsis, Nannochloropsis, Pseudotetraedriella.
Neomonodaceae . ?Botryochloropsis, Characiopsella, Munda, Neomonodus, Pseudellipsoidion.
Goniochloridales . Goniochloris, Pseudostaurastrum, Tetraedriella, Trachydiscus, Vacuoliviride.
Picophagea  [Synchromophyceae ]. Chlamydomyxa, Chrysopodocystis, Guanochroma, Leukarachnion, Picophagus, Synchroma.
SI clade
Raphidophyceae . Chattonella, Fibrocapsa, Goniostomum, Haramonas, Heterosigma, Merotricha, Vacuolaria.
?Actinophryidae . Actinophrys, Actinosphaerium.
PX clade
Chrysomerophyceae . Antarctosaccion, Chrysomeris, Chrysowaernella, Giraudyopsis, Rhamnochrysis, Tetrasporopsis.
Chrysoparadoxophyceae . Chrysoparadoxa.
Phaeophyceae 
Ascoseirales . Ascoseira.
Desmarestiales . Arthrocladia, Desmarestia (P), Himantothallus, Phaeurus.
Dictyotales . Dictyota, Dilophus, Lobophora, Padina, Stypopodium, Taonia, Zonaria.
Discosporangiales . Choristocarpus, Discosporangium.
Ectocarpales . Adenocystis, Acinetospora, Asterocladon, Asteronema, Chordaria, Ectocarpus, Scytosiphon.
Fucales . Ascophyllum, Bifurcaria, Cystoseira, Druvillaea, Fucus, Hormosira, Sargassum, Turbinaria.
Ishigeales  [Ishigeacea ]. Ishige.
Laminariales . Akkesiophycus, Alaria, Chorda, Costaria, Laminaria, Lessonia, Pseudochoda.
Nemodermatales . Neoderma.
Onslowiales . Onslowia.
Ralfsiales . Lithoderma, Neoralfsia, Pseudolithoderma, Ralfsia.
Scytothamnales . Scytothamnus, Splachnidium, Stereocladon.
Sphacelariales . Chaetopteris, Halopteris, Stypocaulon, Sphacelaria, Verosphacella.
Sporochnales . Bellotia, Carpomitra, Nereia, Sporochonus, Tomaculopsis.
Syringodermatales . Syringoderma.
Tilopteridales . Cutleria, Halosiphon, Haplospora, Phaeosiphoniella, Phyllaria, Tilopteris.
Phaeosacciophyceae 
Phaeosaccionaceae . Phaeosaccion.
Tetrasporopsidaceae . Tetrasporopsis, Psammochrysis, Chrysomeris.
Phaeothamiophyceae 
Phaeothamniales . Phaeothamnion.
Pleurochloridales . Pleurochloridella.
Schizocladiophyceae . Schizocladia.
Xanthophyceae  [Heterokontae ; Heteromonadea  Xanthophyta ]
Tribonematales . Botrydium, Bumilleriopsis, Characiopsis, Chloromeson, Heterococcus, Monadus, Ophiocytium, Sphaerosorus, Tribonema, Xanthonema.
Vaucheriales . Vaucheria.
Diatomista  [SIII clade]. Incertae sedis: environmental clades MOCH-1, MOCH-2 and MOCH-4 .
Bolidophyceae  [Parmales ]. Bolidomonas, Triparma, Tetraparma, Pentalamina.
Diatomeae  [Bacillariophyta ]
Leptocylindrophytina 
Leptocylindrophyceae . Leptocylindrus, Tenuicylindrus.
Corethrophyceae . Corethron.
Ellerbeckiophytina . Ellerbeckia.
Probosciophytina . Proboscia.
Melosirophytina . Aulacoseira, Melosira, Hyalodiscus, Stephanopyxis, Paralia, Endictya.
Coscinodiscophytina . Actinoptychus, Coscinodiscus, Actinocyclus, Asteromphalus, Aulacodiscus, Stellarima.
Rhizosoleniophytina . Guinardia, Rhizosolenia, Pseudosolenia.
Arachnoidiscophytina . Arachnoidiscus.
Bacillariophytina 
Mediophyceae 
Chaetocerotophycidae . Chaetoceros, Bacteriastrum, Dactyliosolen, Cerataulina, Hemiaulus, Eucampia, Acanthoceras, Urosolenia, Terpsinoë, Hydrosera.
Lithodesmiophycidae . Lithodesmium, Lithodesmioides, Helicotheca, Bellerochea, Ditylum.
Thalassiosirophycidae . Thalassiosira, Lindavia, Cyclotella, Stephanodiscus, Cyclostephanos, Discostella, Bacteriosira, Skeletonema, Detonula.
Cymatosirophycidae . Cymatosira, Minutocellus, Papiliocellulus, Leyanella, Extubocellulus, Plagiogrammopsis, Campylosira, Brockmanniella, Pierrecomperia.
Odontellophycidae . Odontella, Triceratium, Cerataulus, Pleurosira, Pseudauliscus, Amphitetras, Trieres, Mastodiscus.
Chrysanthemodiscophycidae . Chrysanthemodiscus, Biddulphiopsis, Trigonium, Isthmia, Lampriscus, Stictocyclus, Ardissonea, Climacosphenia, Toxarium.
Biddulphiophyceae 
Biddulphiophycidae . Biddulphia.
Attheya 
Bacillariophyceae 
Striatellaceae . Striatella, Pseudostriatella.
Urneidophycidae . (P?) Plagiogramma, Dimeregramma, Rhaphoneis, Delphineis, Psammoneis, Bleakeleya, Asterionellopsis.
Fragilariophycidae . Fragilaria, Synedra, Tabellaria, Asterionella, Diatoma, Tabularia, Cyclophora, Astrosyne, Licmophora, Rhabdonema, Grammatophora, Staurosira, Thalassionema.
Bacillariophycidae . Eunotia, Achnanthes, Bacillaria, Nitzschia, Pseudonitzschia, Cylindrotheca, Navicula, Seminavis, Haslea, Stauroneis, Pleurosigma, Gyrosigma, Achnanthidium, Cocconeis, Frustulia, Diploneis, Sellaphora, Pinnularia, Gomphonema, Cymbella, Didymosphenia, Phaeodactylum, Amphora, Entomoneis, Epithemia, Surirella, etc.
Dictyochophyceae 
Dictyochales . Dictyocha.
Florenciellales . Florenciella, Verrucophora.
Pedinellales . Actinomonas, Apedinella, Ciliophrys, Mesopedinella, Palatinella, Pedinella, Pseudopedinella, Pteridomonas.
Rhizochromulinales . Rhizochromulina.
Pelagophyceae 
Pelagomonadales . Aureococcus, 'Pelagococcus, Pelagomonas.
Sarcinochrysidales 
Sarcinochrysidaceae . Ankylochrisis, Arachnochrysis, Aureoscheda, Aureoumbra, Nematochrysopsis, Pelagospilus, Pulvinaria, Sarcinochrysis, Sargassococcus.
Chrysocystaceae . Chrysocystis, Chrysoreinhardia, Sungminbooa.

Alveolata 
Colpodellida 
Vitrellaceae . Vitrella.
Colpodellaceae . Colpodella, Chilovora, Voromonas.
Chromeraceae . Chromera.
Alphamonaceae . Alphamonas.
Perkinsidae  [Perkinsozoa ; Perkinsozoa ]. Dinovorax, Parvilucifera, Perkinsus, ?Phagodinium, ?Psammosa, Rastrimonas, Snorkelia
Colponemida  (P)
Colponemidia . Colponema.
Acavomonidia . Acavomonas.
Palustrimonas 
Oxyrrhis  [Oxyrrhinaceae ]
Dinoflagellata . Incertae sedis genera: free-living (Adenoides, Akashiwo, Amphidiniella, Ankistrodinium, Apicoporus, Archaeosphaerodiniopsis, Bispinodinium, Bysmatrum, Cabra, Cladopyxis, Crypthecodinium, Cucumeridinium, Dactylodinium, Dicroerisma, Gloeodinium, Grammatodinium, Gynogonadinium, Gyrodiniellum, Halostylodinium, Heterodinium, Moestrupia, Paragymnodinium, Phytodinium, Plagiodinium, Planodinium, Pileidinium, Pseudadenoides, Pseudothecadinium, Pyramidodinium, Rhinodinium, Roscoffia, Sabulodinium, Sphaerodinium, Spiniferodinium, Testudodinium, Thecadinium, Thecadiniopsis, Togula) and parasitic Blastodiniales  [no longer valid] (Amyloodinium, Apodinium, Cachonella, Caryotoma, Crepidoodinium, Haplozoon, Oodinium, Myxodinium, Piscinoodinium, Protoodinium, Rhinodinium, Schyzochitriodinium, Stylodinium).
Syndiniales . Incertae sedis genera: Ichthyodinium and Ellobiopsidae (Ellobiopsis, Thalassomyces).
Euduboscquellidae . Euduboscquella, Dogelodinium, Keppenodinium.
Amoebophryidae  [environmental Marine Alveolate Group II]. Amoebophrya.
Syndinidae  [environmental Marine Alveolate Group IV]. Hematodinium, Syndinium, Solenodinium.
Sphaeriparaceae . Atlanticellodinium, Sphaeripara.
Noctilucales  [Noctiluciphyceae ]. Abedinium, Cachonodinium, Craspedotella, Cymbodinium, Kofoidinium, Leptodiscus, Noctiluca, Petalodinium, Pomatodinium, Scaphodinium, Spatulodinium.
Dinophyceae 
Gymnodiniphycidae 
Gymnodinium  sensu stricto. Barrufeta, Chytriodinium, Dissodinium, Erythropsidinium, Greuetodinium, Gymnodinium, Lepidodinium, Nematodinium, Nusuttodinium, Pellucidodinium, Polykrikos, Proterythropsis, Warnowia.
Amphidinium  sensu stricto
Gyrodinium  sensu stricto
Kareniaceae . Brachidinium, Karenia, Karlodinium, Takayama.
Ceratoperidiniaceae . Ceratoperidinium, Kirithra.
Torodiniales . Kapelodinium, Torodinium.
Levanderina 
Margalefidinium 
Cochlodinium  sensu stricto
Ptychodiscales . Achradina, Amphilothus, Balechina, Ptychodiscus, Sclerodinium.
Borghiellaceae . Baldinia, Borghiella.
Tovelliaceae . Bernardinium, Esoptrodinium, Jadwigia, Tovellia.
Suessiaceae . Ansanella, Asulcocephalium, Biecheleria, Biecheleriopsis, Leiocephalium, Pelagodinium, Polarella, Prosoaulax, Protodinium, Symbiodinium, Yihiella.
Peridiniphycidae 
Gonyaulacales . Alexandrium, Amylax, Ceratium, Ceratocorys, Coolia, Fukuyoa, Fragilidium, Gambierdiscus, Goniodoma, Gonyaulax, Lingulodinium, Ostreopsis, Pentaplacodinium, Peridiniella, Protoceratium, Pyrocystis, Pyrodinium, Pyrophacus, Tripos.
Peridiniales . Amphidiniopsis, Archaeperidinium, Blastodinium*, Diplopelta, Diplopsalis, Diplopsalopsis, Herdmania, Niea, Oblea, Palatinus, Parvodinium, Peridinium, Peridiniopsis, Preperidinium, Protoperidinium, Qia, Vulcanodinium.
Thoracosphaeraceae . Aduncodinium, Amyloodinium, Apocalathium, Blastodinium, Chimonodinium, Cryptoperidiniopsis, Duboscquodinium, Ensiculifera, Leonella, Luciella, Naiadinium, Paulsenella, Pentapharsodinium, Pfiesteria, Scrippsiella, Stoeckeria, Theleodinium, Thoracosphaera, Tintinnophagus, Tyrannodinium.
Podolampadaceae . Blepharocysta, Gaarderiella, Heterobractum, Lissodinium, Mysticella, Podolampas.
Kryptoperidiniaceae  ["dinotoms"]. Blixaea, Durinskia, Galeidinium, Kryptoperidinium, Unruhdinium, etc.
Heterocapsaceae . Heterocapsa.
Amphidomataceae . Amphidoma, Azadinium.
Oxytoxaceae . Corythodinium, Oxytoxum.
Centrodiniaceae . Centrodinium.
Dinophysales . Amphisolenia, Citharistes, Dinofurcula, Dinophysis, Histioneis, Latifascia, Metadinophysis, Metaphalacroma, Ornithocercus, Oxyphysis, Parahistioneis, Phalacroma, Pseudophalacroma, Sinophysis, Triposolenia.
Prorocentrales . Mesoporus, Prorocentrum.
Apicomplexa . Incertae sedis genera: Aggregata , Christalloidophora , Dobellia* , Echinococcidium* , Globidiellum* , Joyeuxella* , Rhabdospora* , Spermatobium* , Spiriopsis* , Spirogregarina* , Toxocystis* , Trophosphaera* .
?Agamococcidiorida . Gemmocystis*, Rhytidocystis.
?Protococcidiorida . Angeiocystis*, Coelotropha*, Grellia*, Eleutheroschizon*, Mackinnonia*, Myriosporides*, Myriospora*, Sawayella*.
Aconoidasida  [Hematozoa ] (P)
Haemospororida . Dionisia*, Haemocystidium, Haemoproteus, Hepatocystis, Leucocytozoon, Mesnilium*, Nycteria, Parahaemoproteus, Plasmodium, Polychromophilus, Rayella*, Saurocytozoon*.
Piroplasmorida . Anthemosoma*, Babesia, Cytauxzoon, Echinozoon*, Haemohormidium*, Sauroplasma*, Serpentoplasma*, Theileria.
Nephromycida . Nephromyces, Cardiosporidium.
Conoidasida  (P)
Coccidia  (P)
Adeleorina . Adelea*, Adelina, Babesiosima*, Bartazoon*, Chagasella*, Cyrilia*, Dactylosoma, Desseria*, Ganapatiella*, Gibbsia*, Haemogregarina, Haemolivia, Hepatozoon, Ithania*, Karyolysus, Klossia, Klossiella*, Legerella*, Orcheobius*, Rasajeyna*.
Eimeriorina . Atoxoplasma, Barrouxia*, Besnoitia, Caryospora, Caryotropha, Choleoeimeria, Cyclospora, Cystoisospora, Defretinella*, Diaspora*, Dorisa*, Dorisiella*, Eimeria, Elleipsisoma*, Goussia, Hammondia, Hyaloklossia, Isospora, Lankesterella, Mantonella*, Merocystis, Neospora, Nephroisospora, Ovivora*, Pfeifferinella, Pseudoklossia, Sarcocystis, Schellackia, Selenococcidium*, Selysina*, Spirocystis*, Toxoplasma, Tyzzeria*, Wenyonella*.
Gregarinasina  (P). Incertae sedis genera: Digyalum , Exoschizon .
Archigregarinorida  (P). Filipodium, Meroselenidium, Merogregarina, Platyproteum, Selenidium, Selenocystis, Veloxidium.
Eugregarinorida  (P). Apolocystis*, Amoebogregarina, Ancora, Ascogregarina, Asterophora, Blabericola, Caliculium, Cephaloidophora, Colepismatophila, Cystobia*, Cystocephalus*, Difficilina, Diplauxis*, Enterocystis, Ganymedes, Geneiorhynchus, Gonospora, Gregarina, Heliospora, Hentschelia*, Hirmocystis*, Hoplorhynchus, Lankesteria, Lecudina, Leidyana, Lithocystis, Monocystella*, Monocystis, Nematopsis, Nematocystis*, Neoasterophora*, Paralecudina, Paraschneideria, Phyllochaetopterus, Pileocephalus*, Polyplicarium, Polyrhabdina, Porospora*, Prismatospora, Protomagalhaensia, Psychodiella, Pterospora, Pyxinia, Pyxinioides, Rhabdocystis*, Sphaerorhynchus*, Steinina, Stenophora, Stylocephalus, Sycia*, Syncystis, Thalicola*, Thiriotia, Trichotokara, Uradiophora*, Urospora, Xiphocephalus, Zygosoma*, and more.
Neogregarinorida . Apicystis, Aranciocystis, Caulleryella*, Coelogregarina*, Farinocystis*, Gigaductus*, Lipocystis*, Lipotropha*, Lymphotropha*, Machadoella*, Mattesia, Menzbieria, Ophryocystis, Schizocystis*, Syncystis, Tipulocystis*.
Cryptogregarinorida . Cryptosporidium.
Blastogregarinea . Chattonaria, Siedleckia.
Ciliophora  [Ciliata ; Infusoria ]
Postciliodesmatophora 
Karyorelictea 
Kentrophoridae . Kentrophoros.
Loxodida 
Cryptopharyngidae . Cryptopharynx.
Loxodidae . Loxodes.
Geleiidae . Geleia.
Heterotrichea 
Blepharismidae . Blepharisma
Climacostomidae . Climacostomum.
Condylostomatidae . Chattonidium, Condylostoma.
Fabreidae . Fabrea.
Gruberiidae . Gruberia.
Coliphorina 
Folliculinidae . Folliculina.
Maristentoridae . Maristentor.
Peritromidae . Peritromus.
Spirostomidae . Anigsteinia, Spirostomum.
Stentoridae . Stentor.
Intramacronucleata . Incertae sedis: Protocruziidae  [Protocruziidia ] (Protocruzia ).
SAL . Incertae sedis: Cariacotrichea  (Cariacothrix caudata), Mesodiniidae  (Mesodinium), Phacodiniidia  (Phacodinium).
Spirotrichea 
Euplotia 
Euplotida 
Aspidiscidae . Aspidisca.
Certesiidae . Certesia.
Euplotidae . Euplotes.
Gastrocirrhidae . Gastrocirrhus.
Uronychidae . Diophrys, Uronychia.
Discocephalida
Discocephalidae . Discocephalus, Prodiscocephalus, Paradiscocephalus.
Pseudoamphisiellidae . Leptoamphisiella, Pseudoamphisiella.
Perilemmaphora 
Hypotrichia 
Stichotrichida  (P)
Amphisiellidae . Amphisiella, Bistichella.
Atractosidae . Atractos.
Epiclintidae . Epiclintes.
Gonostomatidae . Cotterillia, Gonostomum.
Halteriidae . Halteria, Meseres.
Holostichidae . Holosticha, Uncinata.
Kahliellidae . Deviata, Kahliella.
Keronidae . Kerona.
Oxytrichidae  (P). Cyrtohymena, Gastrostyla, Oxytricha, Stylonychia.
Parabirojimidae . Parabirojimia, Tunicothrix.
Plagiotomidae . Plagiotoma.
Psammomitridae . Psammomitra.
Pseudoamphisiellidae . Pseudoamphisiella.
Psilotrichidae . Psilotricha, Urospinula.
Schmidingerotrichidae . Schmidingerothrix.
Spirofilidae . Spirofilopsis, Strongylidium.
Trachelostylidae . Trachelostyla.
Uroleptidae . Paruroleptus, Uroleptus.
Urostylida  (P)
Bergeriellidae . Bergeriella, Neourostylopsis.
Hemicycliostylidae . Australothrix, Hemicycliostyla.
Pseudokeronopsidae . Apoholosticha, Pseudokeronopsis.
Pseudourostylidae . Pseudourostyla.
Urostylidae . Bakuella, Diaxonella, Urostyla.
Oligotrichea 
Oligotrichida 
Cyrtostrombidiidae . Cyrtostrombidium.
Pelagostrombidiidae . Pelagostrombidium.
Strombidiidae . Strombidium (P).
Tontoniidae . Laboea, Tontonia.
Choreotrichida . Incertae sedis: Lynnella  [Lynnellidae ; Lynnellida ]
Strobilidiina  (P)
Leegaardiellidae . Leegaardiella.
Lohmanniellidae . Lohmanniella.
Strobilidiidae . Strobilidium.
Strombidinopsidae . Strombidinopsis (P).
Tintinnina . Incertae sedis: Helicostomella, Tintinnopsis (P), several other genera.
Ascampbelliellidae . Ascampbelliella
Cyttarocylididae  [probably synonymous with Petalotrichidae]. Cyttarocylis.
Dictyocystidae . Dictyocysta.
Epiplocylididae . Epiplocylis.
Eutintinnidae . Dartintinnus, Eutintinnus.
Favellidae . Favella.
Nolaclusiliidae . Nolaclusilis.
Petalotrichidae  [probably synonymous with Cyttarocylididae]. Petalotricha.
Ptychocylididae . Cymatocylis, Ptychocylis.
Rhabdonellidae . Metacylis, Rhabdonella, Schmidingerella.
Stenosemellidae  (P). Stenosemella.
Tintinnidae . Amphorellopsis, Salpingacantha, Salpingella, Tintinnus.
Tintinnidiidae . Tintinnidium.
Undellidae . Undella.
Xystonellidae . Dadayiella, Parafavella, Xystonella.
Licnophoridae . Licnophora, Prolicnophora.
Kiitrichidae . Caryotricha, Kiitricha.
Lamellicorticata 
Armophorea . Incertae sedis: Mylestomatidae  (Mylestoma).
Metopida  (P)
Metopidae  (P). Bothrostoma, Brachonella, Eometopus, Metopus, Parametopidium, Tesnospira.
Apometopidae . Cirranter, Urostomides.
Tropidoatractidae . Palmarella, Tropidoatractus.
Clevelandellida 
Clevelandellidae . Clevelandella.
Inferostomatidae . Inferostoma.
Neonyctotheridae . Neonyctotherus.
Nyctotheridae  (P). Nyctotherus.
Sicuophoridae . Sicuophora.
Caenomorphidae . Caenomorpha, Ludio, Sulfonecta.
Odontostomatida 
Discomorphellidae . Discomorphella.
Epalxellidae . Epalxella, Saprodinium.
Litostomatea 
Rhynchostomatia 
Dileptida 
Dileptidae . Apodileptus, Dileptus, Pseudomonilicaryon.
Dimacrocaryonidae . Dimacrocaryon, Monomacrocaryon, Rimaleptus.
Tracheliidae . Trachelius.
Haptoria  (P). Incertae sedis: Chaenea.
Lacrymariidae . Lacrymaria.
Haptorida 
Enchelyodonidae . Enchelyodon, Fuscheria.
Homalozoonidae . Homalozoon.
Pleuroplitidae . Pleuroplites.
Didiniidae . Didinium, Monodinium.
Pleurostomatida 
Amphileptidae . Amphileptus.
Litonotidae . Litonotus.
Kentrophyllidae . Epiphyllum, Kentrophyllum.
Spathidiida 
Acropisthiidae . Acropisthium, Chaenea.
Actinobolinidae . Actinobolina.
Apertospathulidae . Apertospathula.
Enchelyidae . Enchelys.
Pseudoholophryidae . Pseudoholophrya.
Spathidiidae . Legendrea, Spathidium.
Trachelophyllidae . Trachelophyllum.
Helicoprorodontidae 
Trichostomatia 
Vestibuliferida 
Balantidiidae . Balantidium, Neobalantidium (P).
Buetschliidae . Buetschlia.
Paraisotrichidae . Paraisotrichia.
Protocaviellidae . Protocaviella.
Protohalliidae . Protohallia.
Pycnotrichidae . Pycnothrix, perhaps Buxtonella.
Isoendo
Isotrichidae . Dasytricha, Isotricha.
Entodiniomorphida 
Blepharocorythina 
Blepharocorythidae . Blepharocorys.
Parentodiniidae . Parentodinium.
Pseudoentodiniidae . Pseudoentodinium.
Entodiniomorphina 
Cycloposthiidae . Cycloposthium.
Gilchristidae . Gilchristia.
Ophryoscolecidae . Entodinium, Ophryoscolex, Polyplastron.
Polydiniellidae . Polydiniella.
Rhinozetidae . Rhinozeta.
Spirodiniidae . Spirodinium.
Telamodiniidae . Telamodinium.
Troglodytellidae . Troglodytella,.
Macropodiniida 
Amylovoracidae . Amylovorax.
Macropodiniidae . Macropodinium.
Polycostidae . Polycosta.
CONTHREEP  [Ventrata ]. Incertae sedis: Askenasia , Cyclotrichiidae  (Cyclotrichium), Paraspathidium , Pseudotrachelocercidae  (Pseudotrachelocerca), Discotrichidae  [Discotrichida ] (Discotricha, Lopezoterenia).
Phyllopharyngea 
Synhymeniida 
Nassulopsidae . Nassulopsis.
Orthodonellidae . Orthodonella, Zosterodasys.
Scaphidiodontidae . Chilodontopsis, Scaphidiodon.
Synhymeniidae . Synhymenia.
Subkinetalia 
Cyrtophoria 
Chlamydodontida  (P)
Chilodonellidae . Chilodonella.
Chitonellidae . Chitonella.
Chlamydodontidae . Chlamydodon.
Gastronautidae . Gastronauta.
Kryoprorodontidae . Gymnozoum.
Lynchellidae . Chlamydonella, Lynchella.
Dysteriida 
Dysteriidae . Dysteria (P), Trochilia.
Hartmannulidae  (P). Hartmannula.
Kyaroikeidae . Kyaroikeus.
Plesiotrichopidae . Plesiotrichopus.
Chonotrichia 
Exogemmida 
Chilodochonidae . Chilodochona.
Filichonidae . Filichona.
Helichonidae . Heliochona.
Lobochonidae . Lobochona.
Phyllochonidae . Phyllochona.
Spirochonidae . Spirochona.
Cryptogemmida 
Actinichonidae . Actinichona.
Echinichonidae . Echinichona.
Inversochonidae . Inversochona.
Isochonidae . Isochona.
Isochonopsidae . Isochonopsis.
Stylochonidae . Stylochona.
Rhynchodia 
Hypocomidae . Hypocoma.
Rhynchodida 
Ancistrocomidae . Ancistrocoma.
Sphenophryidae . Sphenophrya.
Suctoria 
Exogenida 
Allantosomatidae . Allantosoma.
Dentacinetidae . Dentacineta.
Dendrosomididae . Dendrosomides.
Ephelotidae . Ephelota.
Lecanophryidae . Lecanophrya.
Manuelophryidae . Manuelophrya.
Metacinetidae . Metacineta.
Ophryodendridae . Ophryodendron.
Paracinetidae . Paracineta.
Phalacrocleptidae . Phalacrocleptes.
Podophryidae . Podophrya.
Praethecacinetidae . Praethecacineta.
Rhabdophryidae . Rhabdophrya.
Severonidae . Severonis.
Spelaeophryidae . Spelaeophrya.
Tachyblastonidae . Tachyblaston.
Thecacinetidae . Thecacineta.
Endogenida 
Acinetidae . Acineta.
Acinetopsidae . Acinetopsis.
Choanophryidae . Choanophrya.
Corynophryidae . Corynophrya.
Dactylostomatidae . Dactylostoma.
Dendrosomatidae . Dendrosoma.
Endosphaeridae . Endosphaera.
Erastophryidae . Erastophrya.
Pseudogemmidae . Pseudogemma.
Rhynchetidae . Rhyncheta.
Solenophryidae . Solenophrya.
Tokophryidae . Tokophrya.
Trichophryidae . Trichophrya.
Evaginogenida 
Cometodendridae . Cometodendron.
Cyathodiniidae . Cyathodinium.
Dendrocometidae . Dendrocometes.
Discophryidae . Discophrya.
Enchelyomorphidae . Enchelyomorpha.
Heliophryidae . Heliophrya.
Periacinetidae . Periacineta.
Prodiscophryidae . Prodiscophrya.
Rhynchophryidae . Rhynchophrya.
Stylocometidae . Stylocometes.
Trypanococcidae . Trypanococcus.
Colpodea 
Bursariomorphida 
Bryometopidae . Bryometopus (P), Thylakidium.
Bursaridiidae . Bursaridium, Paracondylostoma.
Bursariidae . Bursaria.
Colpodida . Incertae sedis: Bardeliellidae  (Bardeliella), Hausmanniellidae  (Avestina, Hausmanniella), Ilsiellidae  (Ilsiella), Pseudochlamydonellidae  (Hackenbergia, Pseudochlamydonella) and Marynidae  (Maryna).
Bryophryina 
Bryophryidae . Bryophrya.
Sandmanniellidae . Sandmanniella.
Colpodina 
Colpodidae  (P). Colpoda.
Grandoriidae . Grandoria.
Tillinidae . Tillina.
Grossglockneriidae  [Grossglockneriina ]. Grossglockneria, Pseudoplatyophrya.
Cyrtolophosidida 
Cyrtolophosididae . Cyrtolophosis.
Kreyellidae . Kreyella.
Platyophryida 
Ottowphryidae . Ottowphrya, Platyophryides.
Platyophryidae  (P). Platyophrya.
Sagittariidae . Sagittaria.
Sorogenidae . Sorogena.
Woodruffiidae . Etoschophrya, Rostrophrya, Woodruffia.
Nassophorea (P)
Colpodidiidae . Colpodidium.
Nassulida 
Furgasoniidae . Furgasonia, Wolfkosia.
Nassulidae . Nassula, Obertrumia.
Microthoracida 
Microthoracidae . Drepanomonas, Microthorax.
Leptopharyngidae . Leptopharynx, Pseudomicrothorax.
Prostomatea  (P)
Apsiktratidae  [Prostomatida ]
Balanionidae . Balanion.
Cryptocaryonidae . Cryptocaryon.
Colepidae . Coleps, Plagiopogon.
Holophryidae . Holophrya.
Lagynidae . Lagynus.
Metacystidae . Metacystis, Vasicola.
Placidae . Placus.
Plagiocampidae . Plagiocampa.
Prorodontidae . Prorodon.
Urotrichidae . Urotricha.
Plagiopylea 
Plagiopylida 
Epalxellidae . Epalxella, Saprodinium.
Plagiopylidae . Plagiopyla.
Sonderiidae . Sonderia.
Trimyemidae . Trimyema.
Oligohymenophorea 
Apostomatia 
Apostomatida 
Colliniidae . Collinia, Metacollinia.
Cyrtocaryidae . Cyrtocaryum.
Foettingeriidae . Foettingeria.
Pseudocolliniidae . Fusiforma, Pseudocollinia.
Astomatophorida 
Opalinopsidae . Opalinopsis.
Pilisuctorida 
Conidophryidae . Conidophrys.
Astomatia 
Anoplophryidae . Anoplophrya.
Buetschliellidae . Buetschliella.
Clausilocolidae . Clausilocola.
Contophryidae . Contophyra.
Haptophryidae . Haptophrya.
Hoplitophryidae . Hoplitophrya.
Intoshellinidae . Intoshellina.
Maupasellidae . Maupasella.
Radiophryidae . Radiophrya.
Hymenostomatia 
Tetrahymenida . Incertae sedis: Trichospiridae  (Trichospira).
Curimostomatidae . Curimostoma.
Glaucomidae . Glaucoma.
Spirozonidae . Spirozona.
Tetrahymenidae . Tetrahymena.
Turaniellidae . Colpidium, Dexiostoma, Turaniella.
Ophryoglenida 
Ichthyophthiriidae . Ichthyophthirius.
Ophryoglenidae . Ophryoglena.
Peniculia  (P)
Peniculida 
Clathrostomatidae . Clathrostoma.
Frontoniidae . Disematostoma, Frontonia (P).
Lembadionidae . Lembadion.
Maritujidae . Marituja.
Neobursaridiidae . Neobursaridium.
Parameciidae . Paramecium.
Paranassulidae . Paranassula.
Stokesiidae . Stokesia.
Urocentridae  [Urocentrida ]
Peritrichia 
Sessilida 
Astylozoidae . Astylozoon, Hastatella.
Ellobiophryidae . Ellobiophrya.
Epistylididae . Epistylis.
Lagenophryidae . Lagenophrys.
Operculariidae . Opercularia.
Rovinjellidae . Rovinjella.
Scyphidiidae  (P). Scyphidia.
Termitophryidae . Termitophrya.
Usconophryidae . Usconophrys.
Vaginicolidae . Cothurnia, Pyxicola, Thuricola, Vaginicola.
Vorticellidae . Carchesium, Epicarchesium (P), Ophrydium, Pelagovorticella, Pseudovorticella (P), Vorticella (P).
Zoothamniidae . Haplocaulus, Zoothamnium.
Mobilida 
Polycyclidae . Polycycla.
Trichodinidae . Trichodina.
Trichodinopsidae . Trichodinopsis.
Urceolariidae . Leiotrocha, Urceolaria.
Scuticociliatia  (P)
Philasterida 
Cohnilembidae . Cohnilembus.
Cryptochilidae . Cryptochilum.
Entodiscidae . Entodiscus.
Entorhipidiidae . Entorhipidium.
Orchitophryidae  (P). Orchitophrya.
Paralembidae . Anophrys, Paralembus.
Parauronematidae  (P). Parauronema (P).
Philasteridae . Kahlilembus, Philaster.
Pseudocohnilembidae . Pseudocohnilembus.
Schizocaryidae . Schizocaryum.
Thigmophryidae . Thigmophrya.
Thyrophylacidae . Thyrophylax.
Uronematidae . Uronema.
Urozonidae . Urozona.
Pleuronematida 
Calyptotrichidae . Calyptotricha.
Conchophthiridae . Conchophthirus.
Ctedoctematidae . Ctedoctema.
Cyclidiidae  (P). Cristigera, Cyclidium.
Dragescoidae . Dragescoa.
Eurystomatellidae . Eurystomatella.
Histiobalantiidae . Histiobalantium.
Peniculistomatidae . Peniculistoma.
Pleuronematidae  (P). Pleuronema.
Thigmocomidae . Thigmocoma.
Thigmotrichida 
Ancistridae . Ancistrum.
Hemispeiridae . Hemispeira.
Hysterocinetidae . Hysterocineta.
Paraptychostomidae . Paraptychostomum.
Loxocephalida  (P)
Cinetochilidae  (P). Cinetochilum, Sathrophilus.
Loxocephalidae . Cardiostomatella, Dexiotricha, Loxocephalus.

Rhizaria 
?Gymnosphaerida . Actinocoryne, Cienkowskya, Gymnosphaera, Hedraiophrys [possible synonym of Cienkowskya], Wagnerella.
Cercozoa  [Filosa ]. Incertae sedis cercozoan genera: ?Dictiomyxa, ?Katabia, ?Myxodictyium, ?Pontomyxa, ?Protomyxa, ?Protogenes, ?Pseudospora, ?Rhizoplasma.
?Discocelia  [Discocelis ]
?Psammonobiotidae* . Alepiella, Chardezia, Edaphonobiotus, Feuerbornia, Frenzelina, Lesquerella, Micramphora, Micropsammella, Nadinella, Ogdeniella, Psammonobiotus, Propsammonobiotus, Rhumbleriella.
Sarcomonadea  (P)
Cercomonadida  [Cercomonadidae ; Cercobodonidae ]. Cercomonas, Eoercomonas, Filomonas, Neocercomonas, Cavernomonas.
Paracercomonadida  [Paracercomonadidae ]. Brevimastigomonas, Metabolomonas, Nucleocercomonas, Paracercomonas, Phytocercomonas.
Glissomonadida  [Heteromitidae ]
Saccharomycomorphidae . Saccharomycomorpha.
Sandonidae . Sandona, Flectomonas, Neoheteromita, Mollimonas.
Dujardinidae . Dujardina.
Bodomorphidae . Bodomorpha.
Proleptomonadidae . Proleptomonas.
Allapsidae . Allapsa, Teretomonas, Allantion.
Viridiraptoridae . Orciraptor, Viridiraptor.
Pansomonadidae . Agitata, Aurigamonas.
Sainouroidea  [Helkesida ]
Sainouridae . Acantholus, Cholamonas, Homocognata, Sainouron.
Helkesimastigidae . Helkesimastix.
Guttulinopsidae . Guttulinopsis, Olivorum, Puppisaman, Rosculus.
Thecofilosea 
?Mataza
Phaeodarea  [Tripylea ]
Phaeoconchia . Coelodendrum, Coelographis, Conchellium, Conchopsis.
Phaeocystina . Aulacantha, Aulographis, Cannoraphis.
Phaeogromia . Castanella, Challengeron, Haeckeliana, Medusetta, Tuscarora.
Phaeosphaeria . Aulosphaera, Cannosphaera, Sagosphaera.
Cryomonadida 
Rhogostomidae . Rhogostoma, Sacciforma, Capsellina.
Protaspidae  [Cryomonadidae ]. Cryothecomonas, Protaspa.
Ventricleftida 
Ventrifissuridae . Ventrifissura.
Verrucomonadidae . Verrucomonas.
Tectofilosida 
Chlamydophryidae . Chlamydophryse, Diaphoropodon, Lecythium, Trachyrhizium.
Psammonobiotidae . Micropsamella.
?Volutellidae . Pseudovolutella, Volutella.
Fiscullina 
Fiscullidae . Fisculla, Omnivora.
Pseudodifflugiidae . Pseudodifflugia.
Rhizaspididae . Rhizaspis.
Ebriacea  [Ebriidae ; Ebriida ]. Ebria, Hermesinum, Botuliforma.
Imbricatea 
Spongomonadida  [Spongomonadidae ]. Rhipidodendron, Spongomonas.
Marimonadida 
Abolliferidae . Abollifer, Cowlomonas, ?Heterochromonas.
Auranticordidae . Auranticordis, Rhabdamoeba.
Cyranomonadidae . Cyranomonas.
Pseudopirsoniidae . Pseudopirsonia.
Variglissida 
Clautriaviidae . Clautriavia.
Nudifilidae . Nudifila.
Quadriciliidae . Quadricilia.
Silicofilosea 
Thaumatomonadida  [Thaumatomastigidae ]
Thaumatomonadidae . Allas, Hyaloselene, Reckertia, Thaumatomonas, Thaumatomastix, Ovaloplaca, Scutellomonas, Thaumatospina, Penardeugenia.
Peregriniidae . Gyromitus, Peregrinia.
Esquamulidae . Esquamula.
Euglyphida . Incertae sedis: Phaeobola.
Cyphoderiidae . Campascus*, Corythionella, Cyphoderia, Messemvriella*, Pseudocorythion, Schaudinnula*.
Paulinellidae . Micropyxidiella, Ovulinata, Paulinella.
Euglyphina 
Assulinidae . Assulina, Placocista, Valkanovia*.
Sphenoderiidae . Sphenoderia, Trachelocorythion, Deharvengia*.
Trinematidae . Corythion, Playfairina*, Puytoracia*, Trinema.
Euglyphidae . Euglypha, Scutiglypha.
Tracheleuglypha 
Trivalvulariida . Leptogromia, Trivalvularis.
Metromonadea . Metromonas, Metopion, Micrometopion, Kiitoksia.
Granofilosea . Incertae sedis granofilosean genera*: ?Apogromia, ?Kibisidytes, ?Leucodictyon, ?Limnofila, ?Mesofila, ?Microcometes, ?Microgromia, ?Nanofila, ?Reticulamoeba and probably ?Belaria, ?Ditrema, ?Heliomorpha [=Dimorpha] and ?Paralieberkuehnia.
Massisteridae . Massisteria, Minimassisteria.
Clathrulinidae  [Desmothoracida ]. Actinosphaeridium, Cienkowskya*, Clathrulina, Hedriocystis, Penardiophrys, ?Servetia.
Chlorarachnea . Amorphochlora, Bigelowiella, Chlorarachnion, Cryptochlora, Gymnochlora, Lotharella, Minorisa, Partenskyella, Viridiuvalis.
Endomyxa .
Vampyrellida  [Aconchulinida ]. Arachnula, Gobiella, Hyalodiscus, Lateromyxa, Leptophrys, Penardia, Platyreta, Thalassomyxa, Theratromyxa, Vampyrella, Vernalophrys.
Phytomyxea 
Marinomyxa 
Plasmodiophorida  [Plasmodiophorales ; Plasmodiophoromycota ]. Plasmodiophora [Ostenfeldiella], Polymyxa, Woronina, Ligniera [Anisomyxa; Rhizomyxa; Sorolpidium], Sorosphaerula [Tuburcinia; Sorosporium], Spongospora [Clathrosorus], ?Membranosorus, ?Octomyxa, ?Polymyxa, ?Sorodiscus, ?Tetramyxa [Molliardia; Thecaphora].
Phagomyxida . Phagomyxa, Maullinia.
Filoreta 
Gromia 
Ascetosporea 
Haplosporida . Bonamia, Haplosporidium, Minchinia, Urosporidium.
Mikrocytida . Mikrocytos, Paramikrocytos.
Paramyxida . Marteilia, Paramyxa, Paramarteilia, Marteilioides, Eomarteilia.
Claustrosporidium 
Paradiniida . Paradinium.
Retaria 
Foraminifera . Incertae sedis groups: ?Lagenida, ?Heterogromia, ?Komokiacea*.
Monothalamids  (P) [currently under revision]. All genera traditionally in Allogromiida, Astrorhizida, and the Xenophyophorea. Allogromia, Astrammina, Crithionina, Notodendrodes, Psammophaga, Bathysiphon.
Nujappikia 
Lieberkuehniidae . Lieberkuehnia, Claparedellus.
Edaphoallogromiidae . Edaphoallogromia.
Lacogromiidae . Lacogromia.
Limnogromiidae . Limnogromia.
Velamentofexidae . Velamentofex.
Reticulomyxidae . Reticulomyxa, Dracomyxa, Haplomyxa, Wobo.
Tubothalamea . Fusulinida  probably belongs to this group.
Miliolida . Alveolina, Cornuspira, Miliammina, Pyrgo, Quinqueloculina, Sorites.
Spirillinida . Patellina, Spirillina.
Ammodiscidae . Ammodiscus, Glomospira.
Globothalamea 
Rotaliida 
Planorbulinidae . Planorbulinella, Hyalinea.
Discorboidea 
Discorbidae . Discorbis.
Rosalinidae . Rupertina, Discanomalina, "Rosalina", Gavelinopsis, Planorbulina.
Rotalioidea . Incertae sedis genera: ?Criboelphidium, ?"Elphidium", ?Protelphidium.
Elphidiidae . Elphidium.
Ammoniidae . Ammonia.
Elphidiellidae . Elphidiella.
Haynesinidae . Haynesina, Aubignyna.
Glabratelloidea 
Rotaliellidae . Rotaliella, Rossyatella.
Buliminoididae . Buliminoides.
Glabratellidae . Glabratella, Glabratellina, Angulodiscorbis, Planoglabratella.
Calcarinoidea 
Calcarinidae . Neorotalia, Baculogypsina, Baculogypsinoides, Schlumbergerella, Pararotalia.
Nummulitoidea 
Nummulitidae . Nummulites, Operculinella, Cycloclypeus, Heterostegina, Operculina, Planoperculina, Planostegina.
Serioidea 
Uvigerinidae . Uvigerina, Rectuvigerina, Trifarina.
Bolivinitidae . Bolivina, Brizalina, Saidovina.
Cassidulinidae . Globocassidulina, Cassidulinoides, Evolvocassidulina, Islandiella, Ehrenbergina
Sphaeroidinidae . Sphaeroidina.
Globobuliminidae . Globobulimina.
Incertae sedis Rotaliida families:
?Nonionidae . Nonion, Nonionella, Nonionellina, Nonionoides.
?Virgulinellidae . Virgulinella.
?Buliminidae . Bulimina.
?Epistominellidae . Epistominella.
?Stainforthiidae . Stainforthia, Gallitellia.
?Cibicididae . Cibicides, Cibicidoides, Heterolepa.
?Chilostomellidae . Chilostomella.
?Pullenidae . Pullenia.
?Nuttalidae . Nuttalides.
?Discorbinellidae . Discorbinella, Hanzawaia.
?Astrononionidae . Astrononion.
?Oridorsalidae . Oridorsalis.
?Melonidae . Melonis.
?Cymbaloporidae . Cymbaloporella.
?Rubratelliidae . Rubratella.
?Murrayinelliidae . Murrayinella.
Globigerinida  (P)
Parvularugoglobigerinoidea 
Parvularuglobigerinidae . Pseudocaucasina, Palaeoglobigerina, Parvularugoglobigerina.
Eoglobigerinoidea 
Eoglobigerinidae . Alicantina,  Eoclavatorella, Eoglobigerina, Parasubbotina, Pseudoglobigerinella, Subbotina, Turbeogloborotalia.
Globoquadrinidae . Dentoglobigerina, Globoquadrina.
Neoacarininidae . Neoacarinina.
Porticulasphaeridae . Globigerinatheka, Guembelitrioides, Inordinatosphaera, Orbulinoides, Porticulasphaera.
Globigerinoidea 
Globigerinidae . Alloglobigerinoides, Ciperoella, Globigerina, Globicuniculus, Globigerinoides, Globigerinoidesella, Globoturborotalita, Trilobigerina [Trilobatus], Zeaglobigerina.
Globigerinellidae . Beella, Bolliella, Globigerinella, Orcadia, Protentella, Quiltyella.
Hastigerinidae . Hastigerina, Hastigerinella, Hastigerinopsis.
Orbulinidae . Biorbulina, Candorbulina, Orbulina, Praeorbulina.
Sphaeroidinellidae . Prosphaeroidinella, Sphaeroidinella, Sphaeroidinellopsis.
Turborotalitidae . Berggrenia, Turborotalita.
Globorotalioidea 
Catapsydracidae . Catapsydrax, Globigerinopsoides, Globigerinoita, Velapertina.
Globorotaloididae . Clavatorella, Globorotaloides, Protentelloides.
Globorotaliidae . Dentigloborotalia, Globoconella, Globorotalia, Hirsutella, Jenkinsella, Menardella, Neogloboquadrina, Paragloborotalia, Truncorotalia.
Pulleniatinidae . Pulleniatina.
Globanomalinidoidea 
Globanomalinidae . Carinoturborotalia, Globanomalina, Luterbacheria, Planoglobanomalina, Turborotalia.
Hantkeninoidea 
Pseudohastigerinidae . Pseudohastigerina.
Hantkeninidae . Applinella, Aragonella, Clavigerinella, Cribrohantkenina, Hantkenina.
Truncorotaloidinoidea 
Globigerapsidae . Globigerapsis, Muricoglobigerina. 
Planorotalitidae . Astrorotalia, Planorotalites.
Truncorotaloididae . Acarinina, Igorina, Morozovella, Morozovelloides, Pearsonites, Praemurica, Pseudogloboquadrina, Testacarinata, Truncorotaloides.
Globotruncanida 
Abathomphaloidea  
Abathomphalidae . Abathomphalus.
Globotruncanellidae . Globotruncanella, Spinoglobotruncanella.
Favuselloidea 
Conoglobigerinidae . Conoglobigerina, Tenuigerina, ?Sphaerogerina.
Favusellidae . Ascoliella, Favusella, Koutsoukosia.
Globuligerinidae . Compactogerina, Globuligerina, Haeuslerina, Petaloglobigerina.
Hedbergelloidea 
Ananiidae . Anania, Badriella, Costellagerina, Hillsella, Liuenella [Liuella], Loeblichella, Muricohedbergella, Paracostellagerina, Pessagnoina, Planohedbergella, Pseudoclavihedbergella, Vanhintella.
Hedbergellidae . Asterohedbergella, Clavihedbergella, Hedbergella, Microhedbergella, Paraticinella, Pseudoguembelitria.
Helvetoglobotruncanidae . Angulocarinella, Bermudeziana, Bollitruncana, Fingeria, Hedbergellita, Brittonella, Helvetoglobotruncana, Unitruncatus, Whiteinella.
Praehedbergellidae . Blefuscuiana, Gorbachikella, Praehedbergella, Lilliputianella, Lilliputianelloides, Wondersella.
Globotruncanoidea 
Globotruncanidae . Contusotruncana, Globotruncana, Marginotruncana, Obliquacarinata, Sphaerotruncana, Ventrotruncana.
Praeglobotruncanidae . Concavatotruncana, Dicarinella, Falsotruncana, Rotundina, Praeglobotruncana, Verotruncana.
Reissidae . Elevatotruncana, Globotruncanita, Kassabiana, Radotruncana, Sigalitruncana, Turbotruncana.
Planomalinoidea 
Eohastigerinellidae . Eohastigerinella, Hastigerinoides.
Globigerinelloididae . Alanlordella, Allotheca, Biglobigerinella, Blowiella, Claviblowiella, Globigerinelloides, Pseudoschackoina.
Planomalinidae . Bannerina, Planomalina, Pseudoplanomalina.
Schackoinidae . Asymetria, Groshenyia, Leupoldina, Neoschackoina, Schackoina.
Rotaliporoidea 
Rotaliporidae . Anaticinella, Pseudothalmanninella, Rotalipora, Thalmanninella.
Ticinellidae . Biticinella, Claviticinella, Ticinella.
Rugoglobigerinoidea 
Helvetiellidae . Archaeoglobigerina, Bucherina, Dorbignya, Edgarinella, Gandolfia, Gansserina, Globocarinata, Helvetiella, Kuglerina.
Rugoglobigerinidae . Archaeoglobitruncana, Plummerita, Rugoglobigerina, Rugosocarinata, Rugotruncana, Trinitella.
Heterohelicida 
Heterohelicoidea 
Gublerinidae . Gublerina, Lipsonia, Praegublerina.
Heterohelicidae . Braunella, Bronnimannella, Ehrenbergites, Globoheterohelix, Fleisherites, Hartella, Heterohelix, Huberella, Laeviheterohelix, Lazarusina, Lunatriella, Magellanina, Mihaia, Nederbragtina, Planoheterohelix, Protoheterohelix, Pseudoplanoglobulina, Steineckia, Striataella, Texasina, ?Bifarina, ?Rectoguembelina, ?Zeauvigerina.
Pseudotextulariidae . Planoglobulina, Pseudotextularia, Racemiguembelina.
Pseudoguembelinidae . Eicheriella, Leptobimodalia, Pseudoguembelina.
Spiroplectidae . Hendersonites [Hendersonia], Neohendersonites, Paraspiroplecta, Spiroplecta.
Ventilabrellidae . Planulitella, Proliferania, Sigalia, Ventilabrella.
Guembelitriida 
Cassigerinelloidea 
Cassigerinellidae . Cassigerinella, Riveroinella.
Guembelitrioidea 
Guembelitriidae . Cassigerinelloita, Guembelitria, Chiloguembelitria, Jenkinsina, ?Archaeoguembelitria, ?Gallitellia, ?Guembelitriella.
Chiloguembelinoidea 
Chiloguembelinidae . Chiloguembelina, Woodringina, ?Streptochilus. 
Globoconusoidea 
Globoconusidae . Globoconusa, Trochoguembelitria,
Order ? (unnamed)
Globigerinitoidea 
Candeinidae . Candeina.
Globigerinatellidae . Globigerinatella.
Globigerinitidae . Globigerinita, Mutabella, Polyperibola, Tinophodella.
Tenuitellidae . Praetenuitella, Tenuitella, Tenuitellinata, Tenuitellita.
Family ? (unnamed). Dipsidripella, ?Antarcticella.
Robertinida . Hoeglundina, Robertina, Robertinoides.
Textulariida  (P). Cyclammina, Eggerella, Reophax, Textularia, Trochammina.
Carterinida . Carterina.
Radiolaria 
Acantharea 
Chaunocanthida . Amphiacon, Conacon, Gigartacon, Heteracon, Stauracon.
Holocanthida . Acanthochiasma, Acanthocolla, Acanthoplegma.
Symphyacanthida . Amphilithium, Astrolonche, Pseudolithium.
Arthracanthida . Acanthometra, Daurataspis, Dictyacantha, Diploconus, Phractopelta, Phyllostaurus, Pleuraspis, Stauracantha.
Taxopodida . Sticholonche.
Polycystinea 
Spumellaria . Actinomma, Didymocyrtis, Euchitonia, Hexacontium, Hexalonche, Hexastylus, Octodendron, Plegmosphaera, Saturnalis, Spongaster, Spongosphaera.
Nassellaria . Artostrobus, Eucyrtidium, Lithomelissa, Pterocanium, Pterocorys.
Collodaria . Acrosphaera, Collosphaera, Collozoum, Sphaerozoum, Rhaphidozoum, Siphonsphaera, Thalassicolla.
Orodaria 
Oroscenidae  [Orosphaerida ; Orosphaeridae ]. Oroscena, Orostaurus, Oropelex. Nomina dubia genera: Orosphaera, Orodictyum, Orona, Oronium.
Thalassothamnidae  [Cytocladidae ]. Thalassothamnus, Cytocladus, ?Triassothamnus. Nomen dubium genus: Conostylus.
Aquavolonida . Aquavolon.
Tremulida . Tremula.

Haptista 
Haptophyta 
Pavlovales  [Pavlovophyceae ]. Diacronema, Exanthemachrysis, Pavlova, Rebecca.
Prymnesiophyceae 
Prymnesiales . Chrysochromulina, Chrysocampanula, Dicrateria, Haptolina, Prymnesium, Pseudohaptolina.
Phaeocystales . Phaeocystis.
Isochrysidales . Emiliania, Gephyrocapsa, Isochrysis, Ruttnera, Tisochrysis.
Coccolithales . Balaniger, Calciosolenia, Coccolithus, Hymenomonas, Chrysotila, Wigwamma.
Rappephyceae 
Pavlomulinales . Pavlomulina.
Centroplasthelida  [Centrohelea ; Centroheliozoa ]
?Parasphaerastrum.
?Spiculophryidae . Spiculophrys.
Pterocystida 
Raphidista 
Choanocystidae . Choanocystis.
Raphidiophryidae . Raphidiophrys.
Pterista 
Oxnerellidae . Oxnerella.
Pterocystidae . Pterocystis, Raineriophrys, Chlamydaster, Pseudoraphidiophrys, Pseudoraphidocystis.
Heterophryidae . Heterophrys, Sphaerastrum.
Panacanthocystida 
Yogsothothidae . Yogsothoth.
Acanthocystida 
Marophryidae . Marophrys.
Chalarothoracina 
Acanthocystidae . Acanthocystis.
Raphidocystidae . Raphidocystis.

Cryptista 
Palpitomonas bilix 
Cryptophyceae  [Cryptophyta ; Cryptophyta ]
?Bjornbergiella 
Cryptomonadales . Chroomonas, Cryptomonas, Falcomonas, Geminigera, Guillardia, Hanusia, Hemiselmis, Plagioselmis, Proteomonas, Rhinomonas, Rhodomonas, Storeatula, Teleaulax.
Cyathomonadacea . Goniomonas [previously Cyathomonas], Hemiarma.
Kathablepharidacea  [Kathablepharidae ; Leucocryptea ]. Hatena, Kathablepharis, Leucocryptos, Platychilomonas, Roombia.

Incertae sedis Eukarya
Meteora sporadica

Excavates (P)

Metamonada 
?Barthelona
Fornicata 
"Carpediemonas-like organisms"  (P). Aduncisulcus, Carpediemonas, Dysnectes, Ergobibamus, Hicanonectes, Kipferlia.
Diplomonadida 
Hexamitinae . Enteromonas, Gyromonas*, Hexamita, Spironucleus, Trepomonas, Trigonomonas*, Trimitus.
Giardiinae . Brugerolleia*, Giardia, Octomitus.
Retortamonadida  (P). Chilomastix, Retortamonas.
Caviomonadidae . Caviomonas*, Iotanema.
Parabasalia 
?Tricercomitus
Trichomonadida . Cochlosoma, Dientamoeba, Lacusteria, Pentatrichomonas, Pentatrichomonoides, Pseudotrichomonas, Pseudotrypanosoma, Tetratrichomonas, Trichomonas, Trichomonoides, Trichomitopsis.
Honigbergiellida  (P?). Ditrichomonas, Cthulu, Cthylla, Hexamastix, Honigbergiella, Monotrichomonas.
Hypotrichomonadida . Hypotrichomonas, Trichomitus.
Tritrichomonadida  (P?). Dientamoeba, Histomonas, Monocercomonas, Parahistomonas, Simplicimonas, Tritrichomonas.
Cristamonadida . Caduceia, Calonympha, Coronympha, Deltotrichonympha, Devescovina, Foaina, Gigantomonas, Joenia, Joenina, Joenoides, Joenopsis*, Kofoidia, Koruga, Macrotrichomonas, Macrotrichomonoides, Metadevescovina, Mixotricha, Pachyjoenia*, Projoenia*, Pseudodevescovina, Rhizonympha*, Snyderella, Stephanonympha.
Spirotrichonymphida . Holomastigotes*, Holomastigotoides, Microjoenia*, Micromastigotes*, Rostronympha*, Spiromastigotes*, Spironympha*, Spirotrichonympha*, Spirotrichonymphella, Uteronympha*.
Lophomonadida . Lophomonas.
Trichonymphida . Barbulanympha, Eucomonympha, Heliconympha, Hoplonympha, Leptospironympha, Macrospironympha*, Pseudotrichonympha, Rhynchonympha*, Spirotrichosoma*, Staurojoenina, Teranympha, Trichonympha, Urinympha.
Preaxostyla 
Oxymonadida . Barroella, Blattamonas, Brachymonas, Dinenympha, Microrhopalodina, Monocercomonoides, Notila, Opisthomitus, Oxymonas, Paranotila, Polymastix, Pyrsonympha, Sauromonas, Saccinobaculus, Streblomastix, Tubulimonoides.
Trimastigidae . Trimastix.
Paratrimastigidae . Paratrimastix.

Discoba 
Jakobida 
Ophirinina  [=Ophirinidae ]. Ophirina.
Andalucina 
Andaluciidae . Andalucia.
Stygiellidae . Stygiella, Velundella.
Histionina . Histiona, Jakoba, Moramonas, Reclinomonas, Seculamonas nomen nudum.
Tsukubamonadida . Tsukubamonas.
Heterolobosea  [Percolozoa ]
Pharyngomonada . Pharyngomonas
Tetramitia 
Selenaionidae . Dactylomonas, Selenaion.
Neovahlkampfiidae . Neovahlkampfia.
Eutetramitia 
Vahlkampfiidae  (P). Fumarolamoeba, Heteramoeba, Naegleria, Neovahlkampfia, Paravahlkampfia, Tetramitus, Vahlkampfia, Willaertia.
Gruberellidae . Gruberella*, Stachyamoeba.
Acrasidae . Acrasis, Allovahlkampfia, Pocheina.
Percolomonadidae . Percolomonas.
Psalteriomonadidae . Harpagon, Psalteriomonas, Monopylocystis, Pseudoharpagon, Sawyeria.
Stephanopogonidae . Stephanopogon.
Creneidae . Creneis.
Tulamoebidae . Pleurostomum, Tulamoeba.
Euglenozoa 
Euglenida 
Heteronematina  (P). Anisonema, Atraktomonas, Biundula, Calycimonas, Decastava, Dolium, Dinema, Dylakosoma, Entosiphon, Heteronema, Jenningsia, Keelungia, Lentomonas, Neometanema, Notosolenus, Pentamonas, Peranema, Peranemopsis, Petalomonas, Ploeotia, Scytomonas, Serpenomonas, Sphenomonas, Teloprocta, Tropidoscyphus, Urceolus.
Aphagea . Astasia sensu stricto, Distigma, Gyropaigne, Menoidium, Parmidium, Rhabdomonas.
Euglenophyceae  [Euglenea ]
Rapaza 
Eutreptiales . Eutreptia, Eutreptiella.
Euglenales 
Phacaceae . Discoplastis, Lepocinclis, Phacus.
Euglenaceae . Ascoglena, Colacium, Cryptoglena, Euglena, Euglenaformis, Euglenamorpha, Euglenaria, Euglenopsis, Hegneria, Klebsina, Monomorphina, Strombomonas, Trachelomonas.
Diplonemea 
Diplonemidae . Diplonema, Rhynchopus, Lacrimia, Sulcionema, Flectonema.
Hemistasiidae . Hemistasia.
Eupelagonemidae . Eupelagonema.
Symbiontida . Bihospites, Calkinsia, Postgaardi.
Kinetoplastea . Incertae sedis genera: ?Bordnamonas, ?Cephalothamnium, ?Rhynchoidomonas.
Prokinetoplastina . Ichthyobodo, Perkinsela.
Metakinetoplastina 
Neobodonida . Actuariola, Azumiobodo, Cruzella, Cryptaulax, Dimastigella, Klosteria, Neobodo, Phanerobia, Rhynchobodo, Rhynchomonas.
Parabodonida . Cryptobia, Jarrellia, Parabodo, Procryptobia, Trypanoplasma.
Eubodonida . Bodo.
Trypanosomatida . Angomonas, Blechomonas, Leptomonas, Paratrypanosoma, Sergeia, Strigomonas, Wallaceina, Phytomonas, Trypanosoma.
Leishmaniinae . Borovskyia, Crithidia, Leptomonas, Lotmaria, Novymonas, Porcisia, Zelonia, Endotrypanum, Leishmania.

Neolouka 
Malawimonadidae . Gefionella, Malawimonas

Clades basal to Amorphea
CRuMs  [Varisulca ]
Collodictyonidae  [Diphylleidae ; Diphylleida ; Diphyllatea , Sulcomonadidae ]. Collodictyon, Diphylleia [Aulacomonas], Sulcomonas.
Rigifilida . Micronuclearia, Rigifila.
Mantamonas plastica .
Ancyromonadida  [Planomonadida ]. Ancyromonas, Fabomonas, Nutomonas, Planomonas.

Genera of uncertain affiliation
Acinetactis, Actinastrum, Actinocoma, Actinolophus, Adinomonas, Aletium, Amphimonas, Amylophagus, Anaeramoeba, Aphelidiopsis, Asterocaelum, Asthmatos, Aurospora, Barbetia, Belaria, Belonocystis, Bertarellia, Bertramia, Bodopsis, Boekelovia, Branchipocola, Camptoptyche, Chalarodora, Cibdelia, Cichkovia, Cinetidomyxa, Cingula, Cladomonas, Clathrella, Codonoeca, Coelosporidium, Copromonas, Cyanomastix, Cyclomonas, Cytamoeba, Dallingeria, Dictyomyxa, Dimastigamoeba, Dinemula, Dinoasteromonas, Diplocalium, Diplomita, Diplophysalis, Diploselmis, Dobellina, Ducelleria, Ectobiella, Elaeorhanis, Embryocola, Endamoeba, Endemosarca, Endobiella, Endomonas, Endospora, Enteromyxa, Eperythrocytozoon, Errera, Fromentella, Gymnococcus, Gymnophrydium, Haematotractidium, Hartmannina, Heliobodo, Heliomonas, Hermisenella, Heterogromia, Hillea, Hyalodaktylethra, Immanoplasma, Isoselmis, Janickina, Kamera, Lagenidiopsis, Liegeosia, Luffisphaera, Lymphocytozoon, Lymphosporidium, Macappella, Magosphaera, Malpighiella, Martineziella, Megamoebomyxa, Meringosphaera, Microcometes, Monochrysis, Monodus, Mononema, Myrmicisporidium, Naupliicola, Nephrodinium, Neurosporidium, Orbulinella, Ovicola, Palisporomonas, Pansporella, Paradinemula, Parakaryon, Paraluffisphaera, Paramonas, Paraplasma, Parastasia, Parastasiella, Peliainia, Peltomonas, Petasaria, Phagodinium, Phanerobia, Phloxamoeba, Phyllomitus, Phyllomonas, Physcosporidium, Piridium, Pleuophrys, Pleuromastix, Protenterospora, Protomonas, Pseudoactiniscus, Pseudosporopsis, Rhizomonas, Rhynchodinium, Rigidomastix, Schewiakoffia, Sergentella, Serpentoplasma, Sphaerasuctans, Spongastericus, Spongocyclia, Stephanomonas, Strobilomonas, Tetradimorpha, Tetragonidium, Thaulirens, Topsentella, Toshiba, Trichonema, Urbanella.

See also
 Cavalier-Smith's system of classification
 Protist
 Protists in the fossil record

Notes

References

External links
EukMap – Taxonomy Map of the UniEuk Project

Taxonomy
Eukaryote taxonomy